Carlos Gimeno Valero was the defending champion but lost in the second round to Salvatore Caruso.

Gianluca Mager won the title after defeating Roberto Carballés Baena 7–6(8–6), 6–2 in the final.

Seeds

Draw

Finals

Top half

Bottom half

References

External links
Main draw
Qualifying draw

Gran Canaria Challenger - 1